Lumbini Bauddha University (LBU), Lumbini, came into existence on 29 November 2004 after the promulgation of an ordinance relating to it, prior to the second World Buddhist Summit held from 30 November to 2 December 2004. The concept of LBU was formulated on the basis of Lumbini declaration point number 2.6 of the first World Buddhist Summit held in Lumbini from 30 November to 2 December 1998. Major subjects include the Noble Eightfold Path and the other teachings of Buddha.

Buddhist universities and colleges
Universities and colleges in Nepal
2004 establishments in Nepal